The 2013–14 Morgan State Bears men's basketball team represented Morgan State University during the 2013–14 NCAA Division I men's basketball season. The Bears, led by eighth year head coach Todd Bozeman, played their home games at the Talmadge L. Hill Field House and were members of the Mid-Eastern Athletic Conference. They finished the season 15–16, 11–5 in MEAC play to finish in a tie for third place. They advanced to the championship game of the MEAC tournament where they lost to North Carolina Central.

Roster

Schedule

|-
!colspan=9 style="background:#000080; color:#FF7F00;"| Regular season

|-
!colspan=9 style="background:#000080; color:#FF7F00;"| MEAC tournament

References

Morgan State Bears men's basketball seasons
Morgan State
Morgan
Morgan